Lyanne Kosaka (born 6 February 1974) is a Brazilian table tennis player. She competed at the 1992 Summer Olympics and the 1996 Summer Olympics.

References

External links
 

1974 births
Living people
Brazilian female table tennis players
Olympic table tennis players of Brazil
Table tennis players at the 1992 Summer Olympics
Table tennis players at the 1996 Summer Olympics
Sportspeople from Mato Grosso
Table tennis players at the 1991 Pan American Games
Table tennis players at the 1999 Pan American Games
Medalists at the 1991 Pan American Games
Medalists at the 1999 Pan American Games
Pan American Games medalists in table tennis
Pan American Games bronze medalists for Brazil
20th-century Brazilian women